The 1990–91 East Tennessee State Buccaneers basketball team represented East Tennessee State University during the 1990-91 NCAA Division I men's basketball season. The team was led by first-year coach Alan Leforce. Leforce was an assistant the previous year under coach Les Robinson who left to become head coach at NC State. The Bucs finished the season 28–5 and 11–3 in Southern Conference play to finish in a tie for first place. They won the Southern Conference tournament championship in Asheville to receive the automatic berth to the NCAA tournament as the No. 10 seed in the Midwest region. They lost to No. 7 Iowa in the first round. They finished ranked No. 17 in the final AP poll.

Roster

Source

Rankings

Source

Schedule and results

Source

Rankings

Awards and honors
Keith Jennings – SoCon Player of the Year (Coaches), Consensus Second-Team All-American

References

East Tennessee State Buccaneers men's basketball seasons
East Tennessee State
East Tennessee State
East Tennessee
East Tennessee